Adolphus Rankin Britt (April 11, 1915 – March 5, 2001) was an American football end who played for the Philadelphia Eagles of the National Football League (NFL) for one season in 1939.  He played college football for Texas A&M and he was drafted by the Eagles in the ninth round of the 1939 NFL Draft.

Britt later served as a police officer and a member o the city council in Ranger, Texas. He also coached football in Ranger and in Waco, Texas. He also served in the Air Force from 1945 to 1970.

References

1915 births
2001 deaths
American football ends
Texas A&M Aggies football players
Philadelphia Eagles players
Players of American football from Texas
People from Erath County, Texas
People from Ranger, Texas
Wilmington Clippers players